Alamgir Khan is a Pakistani footballer, who currently plays for Wapda Football Club. He played his first international for Pakistan against Chinese Taipei in 2011. Alamgeer played for Police FC until 2012 and then contracted for Wapda FC.  He is from Regi, Lakarai, Peshawar and played for Regi FC in his youth. He has also participated in Striking Defenders Football Club's Night Ramadan Tournament against the host for irrigation football club.
Khan plays as a defender, defensive midfielder or central midfielder.

References

Pakistani footballers
Pakistan international footballers
1991 births
Living people
Association football defenders